Gaius Coelius Caldus was a consul of the Roman Republic in 94 BC alongside his colleague Lucius Domitius Ahenobarbus.

In 107 BC, Coelius Caldus was elected tribune of the plebs and passed a lex tabellaria, which ordained that in cases of high treason in the courts of justice the voting should be secret with each voter marking their decision on a clay tablet. Cicero stated that Caldus regretted this law as having been the source of injury to the republic. He was a praetor in 100 or 99 BC, and proconsul of Hispania Citerior the following year.

Coelius' portrait appears on a small series of Roman silver coins from the late republic. Some of his coins feature the boar emblem of Clunia.

References

2nd-century BC Romans
1st-century BC Roman consuls
Caldus, Gaius
Roman governors of Hispania Citerior
Roman Republican praetors
Tribunes of the plebs